

Applied mathematical sciences